Aalesunds Socialdemokrat (The Ålesund Social Democrat) was a newspaper published in Ålesund, Norway from 1908 to 1910. The newspaper was a successor of another paper, called Nybrot. The editorial team consisted of Julius Berge and Elias Røsvik.

References

Defunct newspapers published in Norway
Norwegian-language newspapers
Mass media in Møre og Romsdal
Ålesund
Newspapers established in 1908
Publications disestablished in 1910
1908 establishments in Norway
1910 disestablishments in Norway